Executive Order 13991, officially titled Protecting the Federal Workforce and Requiring Mask-Wearing (and also referred to as the 100 Day Masking Challenge), is an executive order signed by U.S. President Joe Biden on January 20, 2021. The order commands federal agencies and properties to require that mitigations to help reduce the spread of Coronavirus disease 2019 (COVID-19), as recommended by the Centers for Disease Control and Prevention (CDC), be employed and enforced by the employees and visitors of federal land and properties, including social distancing and the wearing of face masks.

Provisions 
The order states that the heads of executive departments and agencies "shall immediately take action, as appropriate and consistent with applicable law, to require compliance with CDC guidelines with respect to wearing masks, maintaining physical distance, and other public health measures" by visitors and employees of federal land and properties, and commands the Secretary of Health and Human Services to "engage" with political leaders and community members to "[maximize] public compliance with, and addressing any obstacles to, mask-wearing and other public health best practices identified by [the] CDC."

Effects

Reactions

See also 
 List of executive actions by Joe Biden

References

Further reading

External links 
 
 US Presidential Actions
 Federal Register
 Executive Order on Protecting the Federal Workforce and Requiring Mask-Wearing

2021 in American law
Executive orders of Joe Biden
January 2021 events in the United States